Anglican Centre in Rome is an ecumenical organisation which is dedicated to improving relations between the Anglican Communion and the Roman Catholic Church. 
 
It was founded in 1966 with the encouragement of Michael Ramsey, Archbishop of Canterbury, and Pope Paul VI on the wave of ecumenical enthusiasm engendered by the Second Vatican Council and the birth of the Anglican–Roman Catholic International Commission.

The Centre is housed by the Doria Pamphilj family in Palazzo Doria Pamphilj, Piazza del Collegio Romano in historic Rome.

Director
The Director of the Centre is also the Archbishop of Canterbury's Representative to the Holy See; they have always been Anglican clergy and often bishops. The current director is Ian Ernest (previously Archbishop of the Indian Ocean and Bishop of Mauritius).

List of directors

 1970–1981: Harry Smythe
 1981–1991: Howard Root (previously Dean of Emmanuel College, Cambridge, then Professor of Theology, Southampton University)
 1995–1999: Bruce Ruddock (later Canon of Worcester and of Peterborough)
 1999–2001: John Baycroft (previously Bishop of Ottawa, Canada)
 2001–2003: Richard Garrard (previously Bishop of Penrith, England)
 2003–2008: John Flack (previously Bishop of Huntingdon, England)
 2008–2013: David Richardson (previously Dean of Melbourne, Australia)
 2013–2017: David Moxon (Archbishop emeritus of New Zealand and former Primate)
 2017–2018: Bernard Ntahoturi (previously Archbishop of Burundi and Bishop of Matana)
 From 2019: Ian Ernest (previously Archbishop of the Indian Ocean and Bishop of Mauritius)

References

External links
 

Anglican ecumenism
Catholic–Protestant ecumenism
Christian ecumenical organizations